Last season Aris Thessaloniki finished in the 13th place (the league did not compete after coronavirus lockdown in March 2020) of the table but avoided the relegation with Greek Basket League's decision.

For this reason Aris Thessaloniki is participating in the top-tier level Greek Basket League for 67th time in a row.

The team also competed in the Greek Basketball Cup where was eliminated by Ionikos Nikaias in Phase 2.

Due to the COVID-19 pandemic all matches are played behind closed doors and with weekly tests for the teams.

First-team squad

Roster changes

Out

On loan

Competitions

Overall

Overview

Greek Basket League

Regular season

Standings

Results overview

Matches

Greek Cup

Phase 2

Players' Statistics

Basket League

Shooting

Last updated: 26 December 2020
Source: ESAKE

Greek Cup

Shooting

Last updated: 26 September 2020
Source: sportstats.gr

References

Aris B.C. seasons